Palaeolepidopterix is an extinct genus of small primitive metallic moths within the extinct family Eolepidopterigidae, containing one species, Palaeolepidopterix aurea. It is known from the Late Jurassic (Oxfordian - Kimmeridgian) Karabastau Formation of Kazakhstan.

References

†
Fossil Lepidoptera
Late Jurassic insects
Jurassic insects of Asia
†